The Need of Love is the second studio album by American band Earth, Wind & Fire, released in November 1971 by Warner Bros. Records. The album reached No. 35 on the Billboard Top Soul Albums chart. The Need of Love would be the band's final album for Warner Bros. until 1993's Millennium on Reprise Records.

Overview
The Need of Love was produced by Joe Wissert and recorded at
Sunset Sound Studios, Hollywood.

Artists such as Jean Carne sang on the album.

The track, "Everything Is Everything", is a cover of the Donny Hathaway song.

Singles
"I Think About Lovin' You" reached No. 44 on the Billboard Hot Soul Singles chart.

Critical reception

Al Rudis of The Chicago Sun Times wrote "Their second album, The Need of Love again displays some unusual music that might be called avant garde were it not so melodic and entrancing. The nine-member group mixes excellent jazzy instrumentals with harmony singing and chanting, some big band sounds and some free-form parts as well as solid soul beats. It all works beautifully, and while the elements of Earth, Wind and Fire aren't new, this mixture of them is a unique sound."
With a three out of five star rating John Bush of AllMusic stated "The ambitions of Earth, Wind & Fire only increased after their stellar debut, and the group brought an abstract sense of composition to their sophomore record, The Need of Love. The opener, a ten-minute piece named "Energy," is proof enough, with several extended passages inspired by everything from free jazz as well as in-the-pocket funk like Kool & the Gang. The next song up, "Beauty" is also positive and intriguing, though in an overly similar groove as "Fan the Fire" from the first album. The closer, a cover of Donny Hathaway's gloriously funky "Everything Is Everything," does justice to the original (and that's saying a lot). Compared to the debut, The Need of Love lacks a sense of exuberance as well as a passel of solid songs and performances.".  Billboard noted that the album would "is certain to make people more aware of their presence".
Bruce Lindsay of Jazz Journal also gave The Need of Love a 3.5 out of 5 star rating, saying "as evidence of a tight, stylish, band in the early stages of its career this is a worthwhile album".

Track listing

Personnel
 Sherry Scott - vocals
 Wade Flemons - vocals
 Jean Carne - vocals, backing vocals
 Chet Washington - tenor saxophone
 Alex Thomas - trombone
 Michael Beal - guitar, harmonica
 Don Whitehead - acoustic and electric pianos, vocals
 Doug Carn – Hammond B3 organ
 Verdine White - bass
 Maurice White - drums, vocals, percussion, kalimba
 Yackov Ben Israel - percussion, congas
 Oscar Brashear - trumpet solo

Charts

References 

1971 albums
Earth, Wind & Fire albums
Albums produced by Joe Wissert
Albums recorded at Sunset Sound Recorders
Warner Records albums